Khushkhera is an industrial area located within the Tijara Tehsil of the Alwar district within the Indian state of Rajasthan. The area falls within the Delhi NCR region.

Geography
Khushkhera is 210 km from Jaipur, 75 km from Alwar, and 45 km from Gurgaon.

Transport 
RSRTC, gramin bus, local auto and bus service are available. It lies 60 km from Indira Gandhi International Airport, New Delhi. The nearest railway station is in Rewari, approximately 30km away.

See also
 Bhiwadi
 Gurgaon
 Rewari
 Neemrana
 National Highway 8 (India)
 Dharuhera
 Bawal
 Behror

References

Cities and towns in Alwar district
Industrial parks in India
Economy of Rajasthan